Stephen Longstreet (April 18, 1907 – February 20, 2002) was an American writer and artist.

Biography
Born Chauncey (later Henri) Weiner (sometimes Wiener), he was known as Stephen Longstreet from 1939. He wrote as Paul Haggard, David Ormsbee and Thomas Burton, and Longstreet, as well as his birth name.

The 1948 Broadway musical High Button Shoes was based on Longstreet's semi-autobiographical 1946 novel, The Sisters Liked Them Handsome.

Under contract at Warner Bros. in the 1940s, Longstreet wrote The Jolson Story and Stallion Road, based on his novel of the same name and starring Ronald Reagan. He later wrote The Helen Morgan Story, and as a television writer in the 1950s and 1960s he wrote for Playhouse 90.

Longstreet's book, Nell Kimball: Her Life as an American Madam, by herself, is a hoax biography that was partly plagiarized from the works of Herbert Asbury, as was his novel The Wilder Shore from Asbury's The Barbary Coast.

Longstreet's nonfiction works include San Francisco, '49 to '06 and Chicago: 1860 to 1920, as well as A Century on Wheels, The Story of Studebaker and a Jewish cookbook, The Joys of Jewish Cooking, that he wrote with his wife and occasional collaborator, .

The world of jazz was a constant theme throughout Longstreet's life. A number of his books dealt with jazz, Including Jazz From A to Z: A Graphic Dictionary, his 100th book, published in 1989.

He died on February 20, 2002.

Bibliography
Fiction (incomplete list)
The Pedlocks (1951)
The Lion at Morning (1954)
The Beach House (1953)
Man of Montmartre (1958)
Geisha (1960)
Wild Harvest (1960)
Living High (1962)
Remember William Kite?
Pedlock and Sons (1966)
The Young Men of Paris
Pedlock Saint, Pedlock Sinner (1951)
The Last Man Comes Home (1942)
The Sisters Liked Them Handsome (1946)
The Promoters (1957)
She Walks in Beauty (1970)
Plays
High Button Shoes, A Period comedy in Two Acts (1949)
Nonfiction
The Boy in the Model-T (1956)
The Real Jazz, Old and New (1956; reprint 1969)
A Treasury of the World's Great Prints (1961)
The Wilder Shore; A Gala Social History of San Francisco's Sinners and Spenders, 1849-1906 (1968)
with Ethel Longstreet: A Salute to American Cooking (1968)
The Canvas Falcons: The Story of the Men and Planes of World War I (1970)
Nell Kimball: Her Life as an American Madam, by herself (1970) Fiction published as nonfiction.
We All Went to Paris: Americans in the City of Light, 1776-1971 (1972)
Chicago, 1860-1919 (1973)
with Ethel Longstreet: The Joys of Jewish Cooking (1974)
Win or Lose: A Social History of Gambling in America (1977)

References

External links
 
 Stephen Longstreet Papers Finding Aid
 StephenLongstreet.com
 GoodReads.com page
 Stephen Longstreet Papers. Yale Collection of American Literature, Beinecke Rare Book and Manuscript Library.

1907 births
2002 deaths
20th-century American male writers